Sladjan Pajić (born 28 March 1992) is an Austrian footballer of Serbian ethnicity who plays as a midfielder.

External links

References

1992 births
Living people
Austrian footballers
Association football midfielders
Footballers from Vienna
FC DAC 1904 Dunajská Streda players
Slovak Super Liga players
FC Admira Wacker Mödling players
Expatriate footballers in Slovakia
Austrian expatriate sportspeople in Slovakia